
Gmina Ciasna is a rural gmina (administrative district) in Lubliniec County, Silesian Voivodeship, in southern Poland.

The gmina contains part of the protected area called Upper Liswarta Forests Landscape Park.

Villages
Gmina Ciasna contains the villages and settlements of Ciasna, Dzielna, Glinica, Jeżowa, Molna, Panoszów, Sieraków Śląski, Wędzina and Zborowskie.

Neighbouring gminas
Gmina Ciasna is bordered by the gminas of Dobrodzień, Herby, Kochanowice, Olesno, Pawonków and Przystajń.

References

Ciasna
Lubliniec County